This is a list of wars involving the Republic of the Gambia.

References

Bibliography 

 
Gambia
Wars
Wars